An X rating is a rating used in various countries to classify films that have content deemed suitable only for adults. It is used when the violent or sexual content of a film is considered to be potentially disturbing to general audiences.

Australia
The Australian Classification Board (ACB, formerly known as the OFLC), a government institution, issues ratings for all movies and television shows exhibited, televised, sold, or hired in Australia. Material showing explicit, non-simulated sex that is pornographic in nature is rated X18+.

People under 18 may not buy, rent, exhibit, or view these films in cinemas. The exhibition or sale of these films to people under the age of 18 years is a criminal offence carrying a maximum fine of $5,500. Films classified as X18+ are forbidden from being sold or rented anywhere in the six states of Australia. They are legally available to be sold or hired in the Australian Capital Territory and the Northern Territory. Importing X18+ material from these territories to any of the Australian states is legal, as the constitution forbids any restrictions on trade between the states and territories.

France
Films may be shown in theaters in France only after classification by an administrative commission of the Ministry of Culture. In 1975, the X classification (officially: "pornographic or violence-inciting movies") was created for pornographic movies, or movies with successions of scenes of graphic violence. The commission has some leeway in classification; it may for instance take into account the artistic qualities of a movie to not count it as "pornographic". Movies with an X rating may only be shown in specific theaters; they bear special taxes and tax rates, including a 33% tax on revenue.

In 2000, some conservative associations sued the government for granting the movie Baise-moi (Fuck me), which contained graphic, realistic scenes of sex and violence, a non-X classification. The Council of State ruled that the movie should have been rated X. The decision was highly controversial, and some suggested changing the law under which it was rated 18.

United Kingdom

The original X certificate, replacing the H certificate, was issued between 1951 and 1982 by the British Board of Film Censors in the United Kingdom. It was introduced as a result of the Wheare Report on film censorship. From 1951 to 1970, it meant "Extremely graphic, only those aged 16 and over can be admitted," and from 1970 to 1982 it was redefined as meaning "Suitable for those aged 18 and over". The X certificate was replaced in November 1982 by the 18 certificate. 

Sometimes the rating of a film has changed significantly over time. For example, the French film  Jules and Jim received an X rating in 1962 that was reduced to a PG rating in 1991. In some cases, films with extreme political content received an X rating. The Battleship Potemkin was refused a certificate for "inflammatory subtitles and Bolshevik propaganda" in 1926, passed X in 1954, and finally rated PG in 1987.

United States

In the United States, the X rating was applied to a film that contained content judged unsuitable for children, such as extreme violence, strongly implied sex, and graphic language. When the MPAA film rating system began in North America on November 1, 1968, the X rating was given to a film by the Motion Picture Association of America (now the Motion Picture Association) if submitted to it, or due to its non-trademarked status, it could be self-applied to a film by a distributor that knew beforehand that its film contained content unsuitable for minors. From the late 1960s to about the mid-1980s, many mainstream films were released with an X rating, such as Midnight Cowboy, Medium Cool, The Girl on a Motorcycle, Last Summer, Last of the Mobile Hot Shots, Beyond the Valley of the Dolls, The Street Fighter, A Clockwork Orange, Sweet Sweetback's Baadasssss Song, Fritz the Cat, Flesh Gordon, Alice in Wonderland: An X-Rated Musical Comedy, Last Tango in Paris and The Evil Dead. Films that achieved critical and commercial success were later re-rated R after minor cuts, including Midnight Cowboy and A Clockwork Orange. The threat of an X rating also encouraged filmmakers to re-edit their films to achieve an R rating; one notable example of this was the 1987 action film RoboCop, which had to be edited eleven times before it could attain an R rating.

Because the X rating was not trademarked, anybody could apply it to their films, including pornographers, as many began to do in the 1970s. As pornography began to become more popular and more legally and commercially tolerated, pornographers placed an X rating on their films to emphasize the adult content. Some even started using multiple X's (i.e. XX, XXX, etc.) to give the impression that their film contained more graphic sexual content than the simple X rating. In some cases, the X ratings were applied by reviewers or film scholars, e.g. William Rotsler, who wrote "The XXX-rating is for hardcore, the XX-rating is for softcore, and an X-rating is for comparatively cool films." Nothing beyond the simple X rating has ever been officially recognized by the MPAA. Because of the heavy use of the X rating by pornographers, it became associated largely with pornographic films, so that non-pornographic films given an X rating would have fewer theaters willing to book them and fewer venues for advertising. Many newspapers refused to advertise X-rated films. This led to a number of films being released unrated sometimes with a warning that the film contained content for adults only. In response, the MPAA eventually agreed in 1990 to a new NC-17 rating that would be trademarked, and could only be applied by the MPAA itself. By trademarking the rating, the MPAA committed to defending an NC-17 film charged with violating obscenity laws.

See also
 Censorship
 List of NC-17 rated films
 Motion Picture Production Code
 Strong language
 Television content rating system
 .xxx, top-level Internet domain

References

External links 
 Screen Online article about the X certificate
 Refused Classification Website covering in varying detail many films that have run foul of the Australian Office of Film and Literature Classification, with separate sections for hardcore films and video games
 Explanation of X-ratings in the US
 How "X-rated" Came to Mean "Porn" and the Death of Movies for Grown-ups A brief history of the social and legal forces that drove adult themes out of the legitimate cinema, by film director Tony Comstock
 Australian government says yes to R18+ video games bill

Motion picture rating systems
British Board of Film Classification
Motion Picture Association
Self-censorship
Film censorship